Selenomonas noxia is gram-negative crescent-shaped bacteria included in the genus Selenomonas.  Its increase is associated with periodontitis, especially its onset, as well as predominant in 98% of obese women in one study, but also is present in modest amounts in healthy gum tissue.

References

Bacteria described in 1987
Negativicutes